Pachyosa kojimai is a species of beetle in the family Cerambycidae. It was described by Masao Hayashi in 1974. It is known from Taiwan and Japan.

References

Mesosini
Beetles described in 1974